Song of Youth may refer to:

Song of Youth (novel), 1958 Chinese novel by Yang Mo
Song of Youth (album), 2012 Indian album by Yuvan Shankar Raja
Song of Youth (TV series), 2021 Chinese TV series